Gottlieb Göller (31 May 1935 – 27 August 2004) was a German football player and manager.

Göller commenced his playing career between 1953 and 1955 with first division side 1. FC Nürnberg. However, he did not find use in official matches there. He continued to play until 1963 for the second division clubs  Bayern Hof, VfL Neustadt, Wormatia Worms and FK Pirmasens.

After this he worked as an engineer. When working in Togo in 1970 he was given responsibility over the national football team there through mediation of the German ambassador. He took the side to the African Nations Cup of 1972, the country's first participation in an international competition. Later in the 1970s he had a stint with the Nigerian club  Julius Berger F.C. and in 1981 he managed the Nigerian national side for one game.

After a short time in Moçambique he returned to Togo where he took on the national team on three more occasions, on taking it to the African Nations Cup tournaments of 1984, 1998 and 2000. At all of Togo's participations the team exited after the first round.

References

External links

1935 births
2004 deaths
Footballers from Nuremberg
German footballers
Association football forwards
German football managers
1972 African Cup of Nations managers
1984 African Cup of Nations managers
2000 African Cup of Nations managers
FK Pirmasens players
Togo national football team managers
Nigeria national football team managers
West German expatriate sportspeople in Nigeria
West German expatriate sportspeople in Togo
German expatriate football managers
Expatriate football managers in Togo
Expatriate football managers in Nigeria
1. FC Nürnberg players
SpVgg Bayern Hof players
Wormatia Worms players
Oberliga (football) players
West German football managers
West German footballers
West German expatriate football managers